The United States Climate Change Technology Program or CCTP is a multi-agency planning and coordination entity. Its purpose is to accelerate the development and deployment of technologies that can reduce, avoid, or capture and store greenhouse gas emissions. CCTP was established administratively in 2002, authorized by the Energy Policy Act of 2005, and appropriated funds in 2007. Currently, the Department of Energy is designated as the lead agency.

Participating agencies
The following is a list of participating agencies.

 Department of Agriculture
 Department of Commerce (DOC)
 National Institute of Standards and Technology (NIST)
 International Trade Administration (ITA)
 National Oceanic and Atmospheric Administration (NOAA)
 Department of Defense
 Department of Energy
 Department of Health and Human Services (HHS)
 National Institutes of Health (NIH)
 Department of the Interior
 Department of State (DOS)
 U.S. Agency for International Development (USAID)
 Department of Transportation
 Environmental Protection Agency
 National Aeronautics and Space Administration
 National Science Foundation

See also
 Clear Skies Initiative
 Committee on Climate Change Science and Technology Integration
 Energy Policy Act of 2005

References

External links
 CCTP, U.S. Climate Change Technology Program

United States Department of Energy
Climate change in the United States